The voiced alveolar lateral approximant is a type of consonantal sound used in many spoken languages.

As a sonorant, lateral approximants are nearly always voiced. Voiceless lateral approximants,  are common in Sino-Tibetan languages, but uncommon elsewhere. In such cases, voicing typically starts about halfway through the hold of the consonant. No language is known to contrast such a sound with a voiceless alveolar lateral fricative .

In a number of languages, including most varieties of English, the phoneme  becomes velarized ("dark l") in certain contexts.   By contrast, the non-velarized form is the "clear l" (also known as: "light l"), which occurs before and between vowels in certain English standards. Some languages have only clear l. Others  may not have a clear l at all, or have them only before front vowels (especially ).

Features
Features of the voiced alveolar lateral approximant:

 There are four specific variants of :
 Dental, which means it is articulated with either the tip or the blade of the tongue at the upper teeth, termed respectively apical and laminal.
 Denti-alveolar, which means it is articulated with the blade of the tongue at the alveolar ridge, and the tip of the tongue behind upper teeth.
 Alveolar, which means it is articulated with either the tip or the blade of the tongue at the alveolar ridge, termed respectively apical and laminal.
 Postalveolar, which means it is articulated with either the tip or the blade of the tongue behind the alveolar ridge, termed respectively apical and laminal.

Occurrence
Languages may have clear apical or laminal alveolars, laminal denti-alveolars (such as French), or true dentals, which are uncommon. Laminal denti-alveolars tend to occur in continental European languages. However, a true dental generally occurs allophonically before  in languages that have it, as in English health.

Dental or denti-alveolar

Alveolar

Postalveolar

Variable

Velarized alveolar lateral approximant 

The velarized alveolar lateral approximant ( dark l) is a type of consonantal sound used in some languages. It is an alveolar, denti-alveolar, or dental lateral approximant, with a secondary articulation of velarization or pharyngealization. The latter should not be confused with belted , which represents the voiceless alveolar lateral fricative. However, some scholars use that symbol to represent the velarized alveolar lateral approximant anyway – though such usage is considered non-standard.

Velarization and pharyngealization are generally associated with more dental articulations of coronal consonants, so dark l tends to be dental or denti-alveolar. Clear (non-velarized) l tends to be retracted to an alveolar position.

The term dark l is often synonymous with hard l, especially in Slavic languages. (Cf. Hard consonants)

Features
Features of the dark l:

 There are four specific variants of :
 Dental, which means it is articulated with either the tip or the blade of the tongue at the upper teeth.
 Denti-alveolar, which means it is articulated with the blade of the tongue at the alveolar ridge, and the tip of the tongue behind upper teeth.
 Alveolar, which means it is articulated with either the tip or, more rarely, the blade of the tongue at the alveolar ridge, termed respectively apical and laminal.
 Postalveolar, which means it is articulated with either the tip or the blade of the tongue behind the alveolar ridge, termed respectively apical and laminal.
It has a secondary articulation of velarization or pharyngealization, meaning that the back or root of the tongue approaches the soft palate (velum), or the back of the throat, respectively.

Occurrence

Dental or denti-alveolar

Alveolar

Variable

See also
 Index of phonetics articles
 Lateral consonant
 Velarization
 L-vocalization
 Ł

Notes

External links 
 Dark L

References

 
 
 

 
 
 
 
 
 
 
 
 
 
 
 
 
 
 
 
 
 
 
 
 
 
 
 
 
 
 
 
 
 
 
 
 
 
 
 
 
 
 
 
 
 
 
 
 
 
 
 

Alveolar consonants
Dental consonants
Postalveolar consonants
Lateral consonants
Pulmonic consonants
Oral consonants